This is a list of video games published by Bethesda Softworks, an American video game developer and publisher.

List of video games

List of expansion packs

List of downloadable content

Cancelled games

References 

 
Bethesda Softworks